Software Magazine is a software and Information technology magazine. It is owned and published by Rockport Custom Publishing, based in Beverly, Massachusetts, on a monthly basis.

Software 500 survey can be used to gauge the value of the commercial software industry. The survey consists of data of the top 500 software companies.

References

External links
 official website 

Computer magazines published in the United States
Monthly magazines published in the United States
Magazines with year of establishment missing
Magazines published in Massachusetts